Kalafalyk may refer to:
Kalafalıq, Azerbaijan